The fastigial nucleus  is located in the cerebellum. It is one of the four deep cerebellar nuclei (the others being the nucleus dentatus, nucleus emboliformis and nucleus globosus), and is grey matter embedded in the white matter of the cerebellum.

It refers specifically to the concentration of gray matter nearest to the middle line at the anterior end of the superior vermis, and immediately over the roof of the fourth ventricle (the peak of which is called the fastigium), from which it is separated by a thin layer of white matter.  It is smaller than the nucleus dentatus, but somewhat larger than the nucleus emboliformis and nucleus globosus.

Although it is one dense mass, it is made up of two sections: the rostral fastigial nucleus and the caudal fastigial nucleus.

Structure
The Purkinje cells of the cerebellar cortex project into the deep cerebellar nuclei and inhibit the excitatory output system via GABAergic synapses. The fastigial nucleus receives its input from Purkinje cells in the vermis. Most of its efferent connections travel via the inferior cerebellar peduncle to the vestibular nuclei, which are located at the junction of the pons and the medulla oblongata.

The fastigial nucleus sends excitatory projections beyond the cerebellum. The likely neurotransmitters of  fastigial nucleus axons are glutamate and aspartate.

Rostral fastigial nucleus
The rostral fastigial nucleus (rFN) is related to the vestibular system. It receives input from the vestibular nuclei and contributes to vestibular neuronal activity. The rFN interprets body motion and places it on spatial planes to estimate the movement of the body through space. It deals with antigravity muscle groups and other synergies involved with standing and walking.

Caudal fastigial nucleus
The caudal fastigial nucleus (cFN) is related to saccadic eye movements. The Purkinje cell output from the oculomotor vermis relays through the cFN, where neurons directly related to saccadic eye movements are located.

References

Online Medical Dictionary entry

External links
 
 https://web.archive.org/web/20150621011739/http://www.mona.uwi.edu/fpas/courses/physiology/neurophysiology/Cerebellum.htm
 https://web.archive.org/web/20080405062814/http://www.lib.mcg.edu/edu/eshuphysio/program/section8/8ch6/s8ch6_29.htm
 NIF Search - Fastigial Nucleus via the Neuroscience Information Framework

Cerebellum